Martin Inffeld Williams (b 1937)  was the Archdeacon of Margam from 1992   to 2001; and then of Morgannwg until 2004.

Williams was educated at Sidney Sussex College, Cambridge and ordained in 1965. After a curacy in Greenford he was Tutor and Vice Principal at Chichester Theological College then Vicar of Roath, Saint German, Cardiff until his appointment as Archdeacon.

References

1937 births
Living people
Alumni of Sidney Sussex College, Cambridge
Archdeacons of Margam
Archdeacons of Morgannwg